Vanves is a commune in the southwestern suburbs of Paris, France. It is one of the most densely populated municipalities in Europe and the tenth in France

History
On 1 January 1860, the city of Paris was enlarged by annexing neighboring communes. On that occasion, about a third of the commune of Vanves was annexed to Paris, and forms now essentially the neighborhood of Plaisance, in the 14th arrondissement of Paris.

On 8 November 1883, about half of the territory of Vanves was detached and became the commune of Malakoff.

Population

Transport
Vanves is served by Malakoff – Plateau de Vanves station on Paris Métro Line 13. This station is located at the border between the commune of Vanves and the commune of Malakoff, on the Malakoff side of the border.

Vanves is also served by Vanves–Malakoff station on the Transilien Paris-Montparnasse suburban rail line.

Education
Preschools/nurseries:
 École maternelle Cabourg
 École maternelle Forestier
 École maternelle Gambetta
 École maternelle Lemel
 École maternelle Marceau
 École maternelle du Parc

Elementary schools:
 École élémentaire Cabourg
 École élémentaire Forestier
 École élémentaire Gambetta
 École élémentaire Larmeroux
 École élémentaire Marceau
 École élémentaire du Parc

Junior high schools:
 Collège Michelet
 Collège Saint-Exupéry

Senior high schools/sixth form colleges:
 Lycée Michelet
 Lycée professionnel Louis Dardenne

Twin towns – sister cities

Vanves is twinned with:
 Ballymoney, Northern Ireland, United Kingdom
 Lehrte, Germany
 Rosh HaAyin, Israel

Notable people
Jacques Jubé (1674–1745), priest, teacher and memoirist
Bonawentura Niemojowski (1787–1835), Polish politician, lived here
Marina Tsvetaeva (1892–1941), Russian poet and writer, lived here
Albert Gazier (1908–1997), politician, died here
Guy Môquet (1924–1941), member of the Resistance and martyr, lived here
André du Bouchet (1924–2001), poet, lived here
Gérard Jouannest (1933–2018), pianist and composer
Marie-José Pérec (born 1968), track athlete, lived here
Jérôme Rothen (born 1978), footballer, lived here

See also

Communes of the Hauts-de-Seine department

References

External links

  Official municipal website
  
  Lycée Michelet - a historic educational institution

Communes of Hauts-de-Seine